The Horn Mound is a Native American mound in eastern Pickaway County, Ohio, United States.  Located near the village of Tarlton, the mound sits along a stream at a significant distance from any other prehistoric sites.  It is believed to have been built by people of the Adena culture, who constructed many burial mounds and other ceremonial earthworks in prehistoric Ohio.  Although erosion by the nearby stream has the potential of damaging the mound, it appears to be virtually undisturbed by human exploration.  Because of its pristine state, the Horn Mound is a likely archaeological site, and for this reason it was listed on the National Register of Historic Places in 1974.

References

Adena culture
Archaeological sites in Ohio
Archaeological sites on the National Register of Historic Places in Ohio
Geography of Pickaway County, Ohio
National Register of Historic Places in Pickaway County, Ohio
Mounds in Ohio